McGill Street may refer to:
 McGill Street (Montreal), in Montreal, Quebec
 McGill Street (Vancouver), in Vancouver, British Columbia

See also
 McGill College Avenue